Ivan Yanakov (Иван Янъков in Bulgarian) is a Bulgarian-born pianist and conductor. He has performed on four continents, with a repertoire ranging from the Baroque era to contemporary.

Biography
Ivan Yanakov is a classical pianist and conductor. He has performed in over 30 countries in Europe, Australia, Asia and North America. As a recitalist, chamber musician, and orchestra soloist, he has appeared in venues that include the Carnegie Hall Recital Hall in New York, Cadogan Hall in London, Sydney Town Hall, Tokyo Metropolitan Theatre Concert Hall, Sapporo Concert Hall, Okinawa Convention Center, Hong Kong City Hall, Shanghai Oriental Art Center, and others. He is a frequent guest of international music festivals.

Born in Sofia, Yanakov obtained Bachelor's and master's degrees in Piano Performance from Mannes College of Music in New York as a piano student of Arkady Aronov and Stephanie Brown. He was awarded the Artists International Debut Series Prize at Carnegie Hall. He was also a full-scholarship fellow at the Accademia Chigiana in Siena where he studied with Michele Campanella. In Bulgaria, he studied mainly with Meyer Franck and Triphon Silyanovski.

He is the artistic director and conductor of the London Chamber Players, a chamber orchestra composed of young professionals. Yanakov made his conducting debut with the Czech National Symphony Orchestra.

The artist has appeared on television and radio broadcasts in Asia, North America and Europe. Hong Kong's RTHK TV show, “The Works”, broadcast an interview and performance with the artist, as did RTHK's Radio 4 station. Other broadcasting highlights include Live from the Los Angeles County Museum of Art. He is often invited to give master classes at major universities, most recently at the Birmingham Conservatoire and Hong Kong Baptist University. Yanakov regularly adjudicates piano competitions throughout Asia and Europe, and is a jury member of the Ernest Bloch International Competition at the Royal College of Music in London. He is the chairman of the jury at the first Russian Piano Music International Competition in Sanremo, Italy (September 2019). Back in Bulgaria, Yanakov has been a soloist with major orchestras, including Sofia Philharmonic Orchestra, Sofia Soloists Chamber Orchestra, Classic FM Orchestra, and others.

One of Yanakov's projects include The Four Pianists, an ensemble of two classical and two jazz pianists. They have performed four times in Bulgaria in front of 4,000-strong audiences. In 2016, Yanakov, the Four Pianists and the London Chamber Players played at London's Cadogan Hall, alongside Theodosii Spassov.

In 2018 the artist made his Australian debut with a recital in Sydney.

Recordings
Beethoven: Pathétique, Moonlight, Appassionata
Works by Liszt
Chopin: Étude op. 10 No 3, “Tristesse”
Nikolai Kapustin: Etude op. 40 No 8, “Finale”
Dobrinka Tabakova: Nocturne

External links
 Official website for Ivan Yanakov

References

Year of birth missing (living people)
Bulgarian emigrants to the United Kingdom
Bulgarian classical pianists
Bulgarian conductors (music)
21st-century pianists
Bulgarian pianists
Living people